Veriña is the smallest district (parroquia rural) of the municipality of Gijón / Xixón, in Asturias, Spain.

The population of Veriña was 194 in 2005 and 177 in 2008.

Veriña is located in the west of Gijón, being an important industrial and railway axis due to its closeness to the factory of Arcelor.

Villages and its neighbourhoods
Veriña de Baxo
La Estación
El Puente Secu
Samartín
Veriña de Riba
La Campina
El Campón
La Falconera
El Monte

External links
 Official Toponyms - Principality of Asturias website.
 Official Toponyms: Laws - BOPA Nº 229 - Martes, 3 de octubre de 2006 & DECRETO 105/2006, de 20 de septiembre, por el que se determinan los topónimos oficiales del concejo de Gijón.
Pico del Sol (Gijon-Asturias)

Parishes in Gijón